In algebraic geometry, Mnëv's universality theorem is a result which can be used to represent algebraic (or semi algebraic) varieties as realizations of oriented matroids, a notion of combinatorics.

Oriented matroids

Stable equivalence of semialgebraic sets
For the purposes of universality, the stable equivalence of semialgebraic sets is defined as follows.

Let  and  be semialgebraic sets, obtained as a disconnected union of connected semialgebraic sets

Let  be semialgebraic sets,

with  mapping to  under the natural projection  deleting the last  coordinates. We say that  is a stable projection if there exist integer polynomial maps

such that

The stable equivalence is an equivalence relation on semialgebraic subsets generated by stable projections and rational equivalence.

Mnëv's universality theorem
Theorem (Mnëv's universality theorem):

Let  be a semialgebraic subset in  defined over integers. Then  is stably equivalent to a realization space of a certain oriented matroid.

History
Mnëv's universality theorem was discovered by Nikolai Mnëv in his 1986 Ph.D. thesis. It has numerous applications in algebraic geometry, due to Laurent Lafforgue, Ravi Vakil and others, allowing one to construct moduli spaces with arbitrarily bad behaviour.

References

Further reading

Real algebraic geometry
Oriented matroids
Theorems in algebraic geometry
Theorems in combinatorics